Setina aurita is a moth of the family Erebidae. It was first described by Eugenius Johann Christoph Esper in 1787.

Subspecies
Setina aurita aurita
Setina aurita imbuta (Hübner, [1803])
Setina aurita pfisteri Burmann et Tarmann, 1985
Setina aurita teriolensis (Burmann, 1955)

Distribution and habitat
This species is only found in central Europe (Austria, France, Germany, Italy, Romania and Switzerland), in part of the Alps between 1,000 and 3,000 meters above sea level. These moths inhabit stony alpine grasslands, rocky slope and sunny meadows.

Description

The wingspan of Setina aurita can reach 25–32 mm. These small moths have whitish-yellow to orange-yellow forewings with longitudinal dark brown stripes reaching the wings' margins, where there are black dots. In some specimens only black dots are present on the entire wings. The wing drawing is strongly dependent on the altitude. Usually the moths living at more than 2,000 meters show stripes, while at lower elevation they are more dotted. They are exceptionally long haired, yellow, with five longitudinal grayish-black stripes and grayish-black warts. The head is black.

This species is quite similar to the dew moth (Setina irrorella) and Setina roscida.

Biology
Adults of these day-flying moths can be found from April to October depending on the elevation. The females lay their eggs on stones and rocks. The caterpillars live and pupate usually under rocks. The larvae feed on yellow lichens (Xanthoria parietina) and other lichen species growing on the rocks. This species overwinters, often two or three times, as caterpillars, that are active on mild winter days.

Setina aurita, like other species belonging to the genus Setina, is known to emit ultrasounds (a crackling noise) during flight, with the function of courtship signals.

Bibliography
 Esper, E. J. C. 1786. Die Schmetterlinge in Abbildungen nach der Natur mit Beschreibungen. Vierter Theil. Europäische Gattungen. - pp. 1–372. Erlangen. (Walther)
 Heiko Bellmann: Der Neue Kosmos Schmetterlingsführer, Schmetterlinge, Raupen und Futterpflanzen, Franckh-Kosmos Verlags-GmbH & Co, Stuttgart 2003,

References

External links
 Paolo Mazzei, Daniel Morel, Raniero Panfili Moths and Butterflies of Europe and North Africa
 Lepidoptera and their Ecology
 Lepidopteres de France meridionale et de Corse
 Lepi Net - Les Carnets du Lépidoptériste Français

Endrosina
Moths of Europe
Taxa named by Eugenius Johann Christoph Esper
Moths described in 1787